Maxwell Herbert Glass (born 2 October 1925) is a former Australian rules footballer who played with South Melbourne in the Victorian Football League (VFL).

Notes

External links 

1925 births
Living people
Australian rules footballers from Victoria (Australia)
Sydney Swans players